Dungeness is the sixth studio album by Scottish band Trembling Bells. It was released in March 2018 under Tin Angel Records.

Critical reception
Dungeness was met with "generally favorable" reviews from critics. At Metacritic, which assigns a weighted average rating out of 100 to reviews from mainstream publications, this release received an average score of 78, based on 8 reviews. Aggregator Album of the Year gave the release a 75 out of 100 based on a critical consensus of 6 reviews.

Track listing

References

2018 albums
Trembling Bells albums
Tin Angel Records albums